Eva Moreda, full name Eva Maria Moreda Gabaldón (born 7 April 1978) is a Spanish female sky runner, vice-world champion in the Ultra SkyMarathon at the 2016 Skyrunning World Championships.

References

External links
Eva Moreda profile at Corredoras de Montaña

1978 births
Living people
Spanish sky runners